Faizah binte Haji Ahmad Jamal is a Singaporean academic who served as a Nominated Member of Parliament from 2012 to 2014. She was educated at Raffles Girls' School, the National University of Singapore (Bachelor of Laws) and King's College London (Masters in Environment Law).

References

1960 births
Living people
Raffles Girls' Secondary School alumni
National University of Singapore alumni
Alumni of King's College London
Singaporean Nominated Members of Parliament
Singaporean women in politics